Amen is a hamlet in the north-eastern Netherlands. It is a part of the municipality of Aa en Hunze in Drenthe and lies about 8 km south of Assen.

The hamlet has a population of around 90.

History 
It was first mentioned in 1403 as "van Ame", and refers the former Ame river. Amen was home to 44 people in 1840.

Transportation

The nearest railway station is Assen railway station. There are no bus services to Amen.

References

Populated places in Drenthe
Aa en Hunze